Polygamy (called plural marriage by Latter-day Saints in the 19th century or the Principle by modern fundamentalist practitioners of polygamy) was practiced by leaders of the Church of Jesus Christ of Latter-day Saints (LDS Church) for more than half of the 19th century, and practiced publicly from 1852 to 1890 by between 20 and 30 percent of Latter-day Saint families. Today, various denominations of fundamentalist Mormonism continue to practice polygamy.

The Latter-day Saints' practice of polygamy has been controversial, both within Western society and the LDS Church itself. The U.S. was both fascinated and horrified by the practice of polygamy, with the Republican platform at one time referencing "the twin relics of barbarism—polygamy and slavery." The private practice of polygamy was instituted in the 1830s by founder Joseph Smith. The public practice of plural marriage by the church was announced and defended in 1852 by a member of the Quorum of the Twelve Apostles, Orson Pratt, at the request of church president Brigham Young.

For over 60 years, the LDS Church and the United States were at odds over the issue: the church defended the practice as a matter of religious freedom, while the federal government aggressively sought to eradicate it, consistent with prevailing public opinion. Polygamy was probably a significant factor in the Utah War of 1857 and 1858, given Republican attempts to paint Democratic President James Buchanan as weak in his opposition to both polygamy and slavery. In 1862, the United States Congress passed the Morrill Anti-Bigamy Act, which prohibited plural marriage in the territories. In spite of the law, Latter-day Saints continued to practice polygamy, believing that it was protected by the First Amendment. In 1879, in Reynolds v. United States, the Supreme Court of the United States upheld the Morrill Act, stating: "Laws are made for the government of actions, and while they cannot interfere with mere religious belief and opinion, they may with practices."

In 1890, when it became clear that Utah would not be admitted to the Union while polygamy was still practiced, church president Wilford Woodruff issued a Manifesto that officially terminated the practice of polygamy. Although this Manifesto did not dissolve existing plural marriages, relations with the United States markedly improved after 1890, such that Utah was admitted as a U.S. state in 1896. After the Manifesto, some church members continued to enter into polygamous marriages, but these eventually stopped in 1904 when church president Joseph F. Smith disavowed polygamy before Congress and issued a "Second Manifesto", calling for all plural marriages in the church to cease, and established excommunication as the consequence for those who disobeyed. Several small "fundamentalist" groups, seeking to continue the practice, split from the LDS Church, including the Apostolic United Brethren (AUB) and the Fundamentalist Church of Jesus Christ of Latter-Day Saints (FLDS Church). Meanwhile, the LDS Church continues its policy of excommunicating members found practicing polygamy, and today actively seeks to distance itself from fundamentalist groups that continue the practice. On its website, the church states that "the standard doctrine of the church is monogamy" and that polygamy was a temporary exception to the rule.

Origin

Many early converts to the religion including Brigham Young, Orson Pratt, and Lyman Johnson, recorded that Joseph Smith was teaching plural marriage privately as early as 1831 or 1832. Pratt reported that Smith told some early members in 1831 and 1832 that plural marriage was a true principle, but that the time to practice it had not yet come. Johnson also claimed to have heard the doctrine from Smith in 1831. Mosiah Hancock reported that his father was taught about plural marriage in the spring of 1832.

The 1835 and 1844 versions of the church's Doctrine and Covenants (D&C) prohibited polygamy and declared that monogamy was the only acceptable form of marriage:

William Clayton, Smith's scribe, recorded early polygamous marriages in 1843: "On the 1st day of May, 1843, I officiated in the office of an Elder by marrying Lucy Walker to the Prophet Joseph Smith, at his own residence. During this period the Prophet Joseph took several other wives. Amongst the number I well remember Eliza Partridge, Emily Partridge, Sarah Ann Whitney, Helen Kimball and Flora Woodworth. These all, he acknowledged to me, were his lawful, wedded wives, according to the celestial order. His wife Emma was cognizant of the fact of some, if not all, of these being his wives, and she generally treated them very kindly."

As early as 1832, Mormon missionaries worked successfully to convert followers in Maine of polygamist religious leader Jacob Cochran, who went into hiding in 1830 to escape imprisonment due to his practice of polygamy. Among Cochran's marital innovations was "spiritual wifery," and "tradition assumes that he received frequent consignments of spiritual consorts, and that such were invariably the most robust and attractive women in the community." The majority of what became the Quorum of the Twelve in 1835 attended Mormon conferences held in the center of the Cochranite territory in 1834 and 1835. Brigham Young, an apostle of the church, became acquainted with Cochran's followers as he made several missionary journeys through the Cochranite territory from Boston to Saco, and later married Augusta Adams Cobb, a former Cochranite.

Joseph Smith publicly condemned polygamy, denied his involvement in it, and participants were excommunicated, as church records and publications reflect. But church leaders nevertheless began practicing polygamy in the 1840s, particularly members of the Quorum of the Twelve. Sidney Rigdon, while he was estranged from the church, wrote a letter in backlash to the Messenger and Advocate in 1844 condemning the church's Quorum of the Twelve and their alleged connection to polygamy:

At the time, the practice was kept secret from non-members and most church members. Throughout his life, Smith publicly denied having multiple wives.

However, John C. Bennett, a recent convert to the church and the first mayor of Nauvoo, used ideas of eternal and plural marriage to justify acts of seduction, adultery and, in some cases, the practice of abortion in the guise of "spiritual wifery." Bennett was called to account by Joseph and Hyrum Smith, and was excommunicated from the church. In April 1844, Joseph Smith referred to polygamy as "John C. Bennett's spiritual wife system" and warned "if any man writes to you, or preaches to you, doctrines contrary to the Bible, the Book of Mormon, or the book of Doctrine and Covenants, set him down as an imposter." Smith mused

The practice was publicly announced in Salt Lake City, Utah Territory, in 1852, some five years after the Mormons arrived in Utah, and eight years after Smith's death. The doctrine authorizing plural marriage was canonized and published in the 1876 version of the LDS Church's Doctrine and Covenants.

Teachings on the multiple wives of God and Jesus

Top leaders used the examples of the polygamy of God the Father and Jesus Christ in defense of it and these teachings on God and Jesus' polygamy were widely accepted among Mormons by the late 1850s. In 1853, Jedediah M. Grant—who later become a First Presidency member—stated that the top reason behind the persecution of Christ and his disciples was due to their practice of polygamy. Two months later, apostle Orson Pratt taught in a church periodical that "We have now clearly shown that God the Father had a plurality of wives," and that after her death, Mary (the mother of Jesus) may have become another eternal polygamous wife of God. He also stated that Christ had multiple wives—Mary of Bethany, Martha, and Mary Magdalene—as further evidence in defense of polygamy. In the next two years the apostle Orson Hyde also stated during two general conference addresses that Jesus practiced polygamy and repeated this in an 1857 address. This teaching was alluded to by church president Brigham Young in 1870 and First Presidency member Joseph F. Smith in 1883.

Plural marriages of early church leaders

Joseph Smith

The 1843 polygamy revelation, published posthumously, counseled Smith's wife Emma to accept all of Smith's plural wives, and warns of destruction if the new covenant is not observed. Emma Smith was publicly and privately opposed to the practice and Joseph may have married some women without Emma knowing beforehand. Emma publicly denied that her husband had ever preached or practiced polygamy, which later became a defining difference between the LDS Church under Brigham Young and the Reorganized Church of Jesus Christ of Latter Day Saints (RLDS Church; now known as the Community of Christ), led by Joseph Smith III. Emma Smith remained affiliated with the RLDS Church until her death at the age of 74. Emma Smith claimed that the very first time she ever became aware of the 1843 polygamy revelation was when she read about it in Orson Pratt's publication The Seer in 1853.

There is a subtle difference between "sealing" (which is a Mormon priesthood ordinance that binds individuals together in the eternities), and "marriage" (a social tradition in which the man and woman agree to be husband and wife in this life). In the early days of Mormonism, common practices and doctrines were not yet well-defined. Even among those who accept the views of conventional historians, there is disagreement as to the precise number of wives Smith had: Fawn M. Brodie lists 48, D. Michael Quinn 46, and George D. Smith 38. The discrepancy is created by the lack of documents to support the alleged marriages to some of the named wives.

A number of Smith's "marriages" occurred after his death, with the wife being sealed to Smith via a proxy who stood in for him. One historian, Todd M. Compton, documented at least 33 plural marriages or sealings during Smith's lifetime. Richard Lloyd Anderson and Scott H. Faulring came up with a list of 29 wives of Joseph Smith.

It is unclear how many of the wives Smith had sexual relations with. Many contemporary accounts from Smith's time indicate that he engaged in sexual relations with several of his wives. , there were at least twelve early Latter Day Saints who, based on historical documents and circumstantial evidence, had been identified as potential Smith offspring stemming from plural marriages. In 2005 and 2007 studies, a geneticist with the Sorenson Molecular Genealogy Foundation stated that they had shown "with 99.9 percent accuracy" that five of these individuals were in fact not Smith descendants: Mosiah Hancock (son of Clarissa Reed Hancock), Oliver Buell (son of Prescindia Huntington Buell), Moroni Llewellyn Pratt (son of Mary Ann Frost Pratt), Zebulon Jacobs (son of Zina Diantha Huntington Jacobs Smith), and Orrison Smith (son of Fanny Alger). The remaining seven have yet to be conclusively tested, including Josephine Lyon, for whom current DNA testing using mitochondrial DNA cannot provide conclusive evidence either way. Lyon's mother, Sylvia Sessions Lyon, left her daughter a deathbed affidavit telling her she was Smith's daughter.

Other early church leaders

LDS Church president Brigham Young had 51 wives, and 56 children by 16 of those wives.

LDS Church apostle Heber C. Kimball had 43 wives, and had 65 children by 17 of those wives.

U.S. government actions against polygamy

Mormon polygamy was one of the leading moral issues of the 19th Century in the United States, perhaps second only to slavery in importance.  Spurred by popular indignation, the U.S. government took a number of steps against polygamy; these were of varying effectiveness.

1857–1858 Utah War

As the LDS Church settled in what became the Utah Territory, it eventually was subjected to the power and opinion of the United States. Friction first began to show in the James Buchanan administration and federal troops arrived (see Utah War). Buchanan, anticipating Mormon opposition to a newly appointed territorial governor to replace Brigham Young, dispatched 2,500 federal troops to Utah to seat the new governor, thus setting in motion a series of misunderstandings in which the Mormons felt threatened.

1862 Morrill Anti-Bigamy Act
 
For the most part, the rest of the United States considered  plural marriage offensive. On July 8, 1862, President Abraham Lincoln signed the Morrill Anti-Bigamy Act into law, which forbade the practice in U.S. territories. Lincoln made a statement that he had no intentions of enforcing it if the LDS Church would not interfere with him, and so the matter was laid to rest for a time. But rhetoric continued, and polygamy became an impediment to Utah being admitted as a state. Brigham Young preached in 1866 that if Utah will not be admitted to the Union until it abandons polygamy, "we shall never be admitted."

After the Civil War, immigrants to Utah who were not members of the church continued the contest for political power. They were frustrated by the consolidation of the members. Forming the Liberal Party, non-Mormons began pushing for political changes and sought to weaken the church's dominance in the territory. In September 1871, Young was indicted for adultery due to his plural marriages. On January 6, 1879, the Supreme Court upheld the Morrill Anti-Bigamy Act in Reynolds v. United States.

1882 Edmunds Act

In February 1882, George Q. Cannon, a prominent leader in the church, was denied a non-voting seat in the U.S. House of Representatives due to his polygamous relations. This revived the issue of polygamy in national politics. One month later, the Edmunds Act was passed by Congress, amending the Morrill Act and made polygamy a felony punishable by a $500 fine and five years in prison. "Unlawful cohabitation," in which the prosecution did not need to prove that a marriage ceremony had taken place (only that a couple had lived together), was a misdemeanor punishable by a $300 fine and six months imprisonment. It also revoked the right of polygamists to vote or hold office and allowed them to be punished without due process. Even if people did not practice polygamy, they would have their rights revoked if they confessed a belief in it. In August, Rudger Clawson was imprisoned for continuing to cohabit with wives that he married before the 1862 Morrill Act.

1887 Edmunds–Tucker Act

In 1887, the Edmunds–Tucker Act allowed the disincorporation of the LDS Church and the seizure of church property; it also further extended the punishments of the Edmunds Act. In July of the same year, the U.S. Attorney General filed suit to seize all church assets.

The church was losing control of the territorial government, and many members and leaders were being actively pursued as fugitives. Without being able to appear publicly, the leadership was left to navigate "underground."

Following the passage of the Edmunds–Tucker Act, the church found it difficult to operate as a viable institution. After visiting  priesthood leaders in many settlements, church president Wilford Woodruff left for San Francisco on September 3, 1890, to meet with prominent businessmen and politicians. He returned to Salt Lake City on September 21, determined to obtain divine confirmation to pursue a course that seemed to be agonizingly more and more clear. As he explained to church members a year later, the choice was between, on the one hand, continuing to practice plural marriage and thereby losing the temples, "stopping all the ordinances therein," and, on the other, ceasing plural marriage in order to continue performing the essential ordinances for the living and the dead. Woodruff hastened to add that he had acted only as the Lord directed:

1890 Manifesto banning plural marriage

The final element in Woodruff's revelatory experience came on the evening of September 23, 1890. The following morning, he reported to some of the general authorities that he had struggled throughout the night with the Lord regarding the path that should be pursued. The result was a 510-word handwritten manuscript which stated his intentions to comply with the law and denied that the church continued to solemnize or condone plural marriages. The document was later edited by George Q. Cannon of the First Presidency and others to its present 356 words. On October 6, 1890, it was presented to the Latter-day Saints at the General Conference and unanimously approved.

While many church leaders in 1890 regarded the Manifesto as inspired, there were differences among them about its scope and permanence. Contemporary opinions include the contention that the manifesto was more related to an effort to achieve statehood for the Utah territory. Some leaders were reluctant to terminate a long-standing practice that was regarded as divinely mandated. As a result, over 200 plural marriages were performed between 1890 and 1904.

1904 Second Manifesto

It was not until 1904, under the leadership of church president Joseph F. Smith, that the church completely banned new plural marriages worldwide. Not surprisingly, rumors persisted of marriages performed after the 1890 Manifesto, and beginning in January 1904, testimony given in the Smoot hearings made it clear that plural marriage had not been completely extinguished.

The ambiguity was ended in the General Conference of April 1904, when Smith issued the "Second Manifesto," an emphatic declaration that prohibited plural marriage and proclaimed that offenders would be subject to church discipline. It declared that any who participated in additional plural marriages, and those officiating, would be excommunicated from the church. Those disagreeing with the Second Manifesto included apostles Matthias F. Cowley and John W. Taylor, who both resigned from the Quorum of the Twelve. Cowley retained his membership in the church, but Taylor was later excommunicated.

Although the Second Manifesto ended the official practice of new plural marriages, existing plural marriages were not automatically dissolved. Many Mormons, including prominent church leaders, maintained existing plural marriages into the 1940s and 1950s.

In 1943, the First Presidency learned that apostle Richard R. Lyman was cohabitating with a woman other than his legal wife. As it turned out, in 1925 Lyman had begun a relationship which he defined as a polygamous marriage. Unable to trust anyone else to officiate, Lyman and the woman exchanged vows secretly. By 1943, both were in their seventies. Lyman was excommunicated on November 12, 1943. The Quorum of the Twelve provided the newspapers with a one-sentence announcement, stating that the ground for excommunication was violation of the law of chastity.

Remnants within sects

Over time, many of those who rejected the LDS Church's relinquishment of plural marriage formed small, close-knit communities in areas of the Rocky Mountains. These groups continue to practice "the Principle." In the 1940s, LDS Church apostle Mark E. Petersen coined the term "Mormon fundamentalist" to describe such people. Fundamentalists either practice as individuals, as families, or as part of organized denominations. Today, the LDS Church objects to the use of the term "Mormon fundamentalists" and suggests using the term "polygamist sects" to avoid confusion about whether the main body of Mormon believers teach or practice polygamy.

Mormon fundamentalists believe that plural marriage is a requirement for exaltation and entry into the highest level of the celestial kingdom. These beliefs stem from statements by 19th-century Mormon authorities including Brigham Young (although some of these leaders gave possibly conflicting statements that a monogamist may obtain at least a lower degree of "exaltation" through mere belief in polygamy).

For public relations reasons, the LDS Church has sought vigorously to disassociate itself from Mormon fundamentalists and the practice of plural marriage. Although the LDS Church has requested that journalists not refer to Mormon fundamentalists using the term "Mormon," journalists generally have not complied, and "Mormon fundamentalist" has become standard terminology. Mormon fundamentalists themselves embrace the term "Mormon" and share a religious heritage and beliefs with the LDS Church, including canonization of the Book of Mormon and a claim that Joseph Smith is the founder of their religion.

Modern plural marriage theory within the LDS Church

Although the LDS Church has abandoned the practice of plural marriage, it has not abandoned the underlying doctrines of polygamy. According to the church's sacred texts and pronouncements by its leaders and theologians, the church leaves open the possibility that it may one day re-institute the practice. It is still the practice of monogamous Mormon couples to be sealed to one another. However, in some circumstances, men and women may be sealed to multiple spouses. Most commonly, a man may be sealed to multiple wives: if his first wife dies, he may be sealed to a second wife. A deceased woman may also be sealed to multiple men, but only through vicarious sealing if they are also deceased.

Reasons for polygamy
As early as the publication of the Book of Mormon in 1830, Latter Day Saint doctrine maintained that polygamy was allowable only if it was commanded by God. The Book of Jacob condemned polygamy as adultery, but left open the proviso that "For if I will, saith the Lord of Hosts, raise up seed unto me, I will command my people; otherwise, they shall hearken unto these things." Thus, the LDS Church today teaches that plural marriage can only be practiced when specifically authorized by God. According to this view, the 1890 Manifesto and Second Manifesto rescinded God's prior authorization given to Joseph Smith.

However, Bruce R. McConkie controversially stated in his 1958 book, Mormon Doctrine, that God will "obviously" re-institute the practice of polygamy after the Second Coming of Jesus Christ. This echoes earlier teachings by Brigham Young that the primary purpose of polygamy was to bring about the Millennium. Current official church materials do not make any mention of the future re-institution of plural marriage.

Multiple sealings when a prior spouse has died
In the case where a man's first wife dies, and the man remarries, and both of the marriages involve a sealing, LDS authorities teach that in the afterlife, the man will enter a polygamous relationship with both wives. Current apostles Russell M. Nelson and Dallin H. Oaks are examples of such a case.

Under LDS Church policy, a man whose sealed wife has died does not have to request any permission beyond having a current temple recommend and an interview with his bishop to get final permission for a living ordinance, to be married in the temple and sealed to another woman, unless the new wife's circumstance requires a cancellation of sealing. However, a woman whose sealed husband has died is still bound by the original sealing and must request a cancellation of sealing to be sealed to another man (see next paragraph for exception to this after she dies). In some cases, women in this situation who wish to remarry choose to be married to a subsequent husband and are not sealed to them, leaving them sealed to their first husband for eternity.

As of 1998, however, women who have died may be sealed to more than one man. In 1998, the LDS Church created a new policy that a woman may also be sealed to more than one man. A woman, however, may not be sealed to more than one man while she is alive. She may only be sealed to subsequent partners after both she and her husband(s) have died. Thus, if a widow who was sealed to her first husband remarries, she may be sealed by proxy to all of her subsequent husband(s), but only after both she and the subsequent husbands have died. Proxy sealings, like proxy baptisms, are merely offered to the person in the afterlife, indicating that the purpose is to allow the woman to choose the right man to be sealed to. 

In the twenty-first century, church leadership has taught that doctrinal knowledge about the nature of family relations in the afterlife is limited and there is no official church teaching on how multiple marriages in life play out in the afterlife beyond trust in God that such matters will work out happily.

Multiple sealings when marriages end in divorce
A man who is sealed to a woman but later divorced must apply for a "sealing clearance" from the First Presidency in order to be sealed to another woman. Receiving clearance does not void or invalidate the first sealing. A woman in the same circumstances would apply to the First Presidency for a "cancellation of sealing" (sometimes called a "temple divorce"), allowing her to be sealed to another man. This approval voids the original sealing as far as the woman is concerned. Divorced women who have not applied for a sealing cancellation are considered sealed to the original husband. However, according to Drs. Joseph Stuart and Janiece Johnson of the Neal A. Maxwell Institute for Religious Scholarship, even in the afterlife the marriage relationship is voluntary, so no person could be forced into an eternal relationship through a temple sealing they do not wish to be in. Divorced women may also be granted a cancellation of sealing, even though they do not intend to marry someone else. In this case, they are no longer regarded as being sealed to anyone and are presumed to have the same eternal status as unwed women.

Proxy sealings where both spouses have died
According to church policy, after a man has died, he may be sealed by proxy to all of the women to whom he was legally married while he was alive. The same is true for women; however, if a woman was sealed to a man while she was alive, all of her husbands must be deceased before she can be sealed by proxy to them.

Church doctrine is not entirely specific on the status of men or women who are sealed by proxy to multiple spouses. There are at least two possibilities:
 Regardless of how many people a man or woman is sealed to by proxy, they will only remain with one of them in the afterlife, and that the remaining spouses, who might still merit the full benefits of exaltation that come from being sealed, would then marry another person in order to ensure each has an eternal marriage.
 These sealings create effective plural marriages that will continue after death. There are no church teachings clarifying whether polyandrous relationships can exist in the afterlife, so some church members doubt whether this possibility would apply to women who are sealed by proxy to multiple spouses. The possibility for women to be sealed to multiple men is a recent policy change enacted in 1998. Church leaders have neither explained this change, nor its doctrinal implications.

Criticism of plural marriage

Instances of unhappy plural marriage
Critics of polygamy in the early LDS Church claim that plural marriages produced unhappiness in some wives. LDS historian Todd Compton, in his book In Sacred Loneliness, described various instances where some wives in polygamous marriages were unhappy with polygamy.

A means for male sexual gratification
Critics of polygamy in the early LDS Church claim that church leaders established the practice of polygamy in order to further their immoral desires for sexual gratification with multiple sexual partners.  Critics point to the fact that church leaders practiced polygamy in secret from 1833 to 1852, despite a written church doctrine (Doctrine and Covenants 101, 1835 edition) renouncing polygamy and stating that only monogamous marriages were permitted. Critics also cite several first-person accounts of early church leaders attempting to use the polygamy doctrine to enter into illicit relationships with women. Critics also assert that Joseph Smith instituted polygamy in order to cover up an 1835 adulterous affair with a neighbor's daughter, Fanny Alger, by taking Alger as his second wife. Compton dates this marriage to March or April 1833, well before Joseph was accused of an affair. However, historian Lawrence Foster dismisses the marriage of Alger to Joseph Smith as "debatable supposition" rather than "established fact."

Others conclude that many Latter-day Saints entered into plural marriage based on the belief that it was a religious commandment, rather than as an excuse for sexual license. For instance, many of the figures who came to be best associated with plural marriage, including church president Brigham Young and his counselor Heber C. Kimball, expressed revulsion at the system when it was first introduced to them. Young famously stated that after receiving the commandment to practice plural marriage in Nauvoo, he saw a funeral procession walking down the street and he wished he could exchange places with the corpse. He recalled that "I was not desirous of shrinking from any duty, nor of failing in the least to do as I was commanded, but it was the first time in my life that I had desired the grave, and I could hardly get over it for a long time." When Kimball first heard of the principle, he believed that he would marry elderly women whom he would care for and who would not be a threat to his first wife Vilate. He was later shocked to learn that he was to marry a younger woman. His biographer writes that he "became sick in body, but his mental wretchedness was too great to allow of his retiring, and he would walk the floor till nearly morning, and sometimes the agony of his mind was so terrible that he would wring his hands and weep like a child." While his wife Vilate had trials "grievous to bear" as a result of her acceptance of plural marriage, she supported her husband in his religious duties, and taught her children that "she could not doubt the plural order of marriage was of God, for the Lord had revealed it to her in answer to prayer."

Underage plural marriages
Critics of polygamy in the early LDS Church claim that church leaders sometimes used polygamy to take advantage of young girls for immoral purposes. Historian George D. Smith studied 153 men who took plural wives in the early years of the Latter Day Saint movement, and found that two of the girls were thirteen years old, 13 girls were fourteen years old, 21 were fifteen years old, and 53 were sixteen years old. Historian Todd Compton documented that Joseph Smith married one girl who was fourteen-years old (possibly two); according to Compton, "it is unlikely that the marriage was consummated". Historian Stanly Hirshon documented cases of girls aged 10 and 11 being married to old men.

The mean age of marriage for women was lower in Mormon polygamy than in New England and the Northeastern states (the societies in which Smith and many early converts to the movement had lived). This was partly caused by the practice of polygamy, and Compton concludes that "Early marriage and very early marriage were… accepted" in early Mormonism. These marriages were frequently "dynastic" in purpose, meant to join people to the families of leaders, motivated by the significance of marriage for the nineteenth-century Latter-day Saint understanding of the afterlife. According to Compton, the "valid parallel" for Mormon early marriages is the "American and European history of elite early marriages that were not consummated until the marriage participants were much older". Compton "find[s] dynastic marriages of teenage girls problematic, even if sexual consummation is delayed".

However, it seems that Brigham Young attempted to stamp out the practice of men being sealed to excessively young girls. In 1857, he stated, "I shall not seal the people as I have done. Old Father Alread brought three young girls 12 & 13 years old. I would not seal them to him. They would not be equally yoked together. . . . Many get their endowments who are not worthy and this is the way that devils are made."

Instances of coercion 
Critics of polygamy in the early LDS Church have documented several cases where deception and coercion were used to induce marriage, for example citing the case of Joseph Smith who warned some potential spouses of eternal damnation if they did not consent to be his wife. In 1893, married LDS Church member John D. Miles traveled to England and proposed to Caroline Owens, assuring her that he was not polygamous. She returned to Utah and participated in a wedding, only to find out after the ceremony that Miles was already married. She ran away, but Miles hunted her down and raped her. She eventually escaped, and filed a lawsuit against Miles that reached the Supreme Court and became a significant case in polygamy case law. Ann Eliza Young, nineteenth wife of Brigham Young, claimed that Young coerced her to marry him by threatening financial ruin of her brother.

Incestuous plural marriages
Critics of polygamy in the early LDS Church claim that polygamy was used to justify marriage of close relatives that would otherwise be considered immoral. In 1843, Joseph Smith's diary records the sealing of John Milton Bernhisel to his sister, Maria, in a ceremony that included the sealing of Bernhisel to multiple relatives, some of whom were deceased. However, this is understood by most scholars as the collective sealing or binding of the family and not a marriage between Bernhisel and his sister. Similar family sealings are practiced in Latter-Day Saint temples today, where children of parents who were not sealed at the time of their marriage are sealed to their parents and to one another in a group ceremony.

See also

 Criticism of the Latter Day Saint movement
 The Church of Jesus Christ of Latter-day Saints and politics in the United States
 Marriage in The Church of Jesus Christ of Latter-day Saints
 Short Creek raid
 Sister Wives

Notes

References

Further reading

Books

 Talbot, Christine. A Foreign Kingdom: Mormons and Polygamy in American Political Culture, 1852-1890. Urbana, IL: University of Illinois Press, 2013.
 Smith, William Victor. "Textual Studies of the Doctrine and Covenants: The Plural Marriage Revelation." Salt Lake City, UT: Greg Kofford Books, 2018.

Journal articles

philosophy, sociology, psychology, and secularity

Other
 
  – provides a historical overview
  – about the beginnings of plural marriage in the church
   – about plural marriage in Utah
  – about the gradual ending of plural marriage

External links
 

 
Discrimination in the United States
Mormon studies
Polygyny
Polygamy in the United States
Harold B. Lee Library-related 19th century articles